Karel Vinck (born 19 September 1938, in Aalst) is a Belgian businessman. In 1994 the readers of the weekly business magazine Trends chose him to be the Manager of the year. He graduated as a Master in Electrical and Mechanical Engineering from the Katholieke Universiteit Leuven (Leuven, Belgium) and got an MBA from Cornell University (Ithaca, New York, United States).

Career
He started his career at Eternit. Afterwards Karel Vinck was director of Bekaert N.V from 1985 up to 1994.
In 1995, he started working for Union Minière, where he led the restructuring of the company.

He is also a member of the Board of Suez-Tractebel, Tessenderlo Group, of the Katholieke Universiteit Leuven and of the Théâtre Royal de la Monnaie. He is Co-ordinator of the European Rail Traffic Management System (ERTMS) with the European Commission, and chairman of Cumerio. Karel Vinck is honorary chairman of the Flemish employers association (VEV), and Chairman of the Flemish Science Policy Council.

Sources
 Karel Vinck (Umicore)

1938 births
Living people
Flemish businesspeople
KU Leuven alumni
People from Aalst, Belgium
Samuel Curtis Johnson Graduate School of Management alumni